Juan Esteban Curuchet (born 4 February 1965 in Mar del Plata) is a road bicycle racer and track cyclist from Argentina.

Curuchet represented Argentina at the Summer Olympics in 1984, 1988, 1996, 2000, 2004, and 2008.

He won the madison at the 1999 Pan American Games with his older brother, Gabriel Ovidio Curuchet. He also won the madison at the 2003 Pan American Games and 2007 Pan American Games alongside Walter Pérez and the Cycling World Championships in 2004 (Men's Madison).

Curuchet holds an Argentine record of participating in six non-consecutive Olympic games. He closed his Olympic career at age 43, by winning the Men's Madison gold medal at the 2008 Summer Olympics with Walter Pérez.

In 2008, he received the gold Gold Olimpia Award as the best athlete of the year from his country with Walter Pérez. In 2000 and 2010 he won the Platinum Konex Award as the best cyclist of the last decade in Argentina.

Major results

1992
3rd Points race, UCI Track Cycling World Championships, Valencia
2nd Six Days of Buenos Aires (ARG)

1994
1st Vuelta al Valle (ARG)

1995
2nd Madison, UCI Track Cycling World Championships, Bogota
1st Mar del Plata, Six Days (ARG) (with Gabriel Curuchet

1997
1st Clásica del Oeste-Doble Bragado (ARG)
2nd Medellin, Six Days (COL)
3rd Madison, UCI Track Cycling World Championships, Perth

1998
1st Clásica del Oeste-Doble Bragado (ARG)
1st National Time Trial Championship, Argentina (ARG)
1st UCI Track World Cup, Cali, Madison (COL) (with Gabriel Curuchet)

1999
1st Six Days of Buenos Aires (ARG) (with Gabriel Curuchet)
1st Frisco, Madison, Frisco, Texas, (USA) (with Gabriel Curuchet)
2nd UCI Track World Cup, Cali, Madison (COL)
1st UCI Track World Cup, Cali, Points race (COL)

2000
1st Clásica del Oeste-Doble Bragado (ARG)
3rd Madison, UCI Track Cycling World Championships, Manchester
1st Six Days of Buenos Aires (ARG) (with Gabriel Curuchet)

2001
3rd Madison, UCI Track Cycling World Championships, Antwerp
2nd Points race, UCI Track Cycling World Championships

2002
2nd Aguascalientes, Six Days (MEX)
3rd Madison, UCI Track Cycling World Championships
3rd Points race, UCI Track Cycling World Championships
1st National Time Trial Championship, Santiago del Estero (ARG)

2003
3rd Madison, UCI Track Cycling World Championships
3rd Vuelta de San Juan (ARG)
2nd Stage 2, Vuelta de San Juan
1st Clásica del Oeste-Doble Bragado (ARG)
3rd Stage 4 Clásica del Oeste-Doble Bragado
2nd Stage 5b, Clásica del Oeste-Doble Bragado
1st Stage 5a, Clásica del Oeste-Doble Bragado
1st UCI Track World Cup, Aguascalientes, Madison (MEX) (with Walter Pérez)
2nd UCI Track World Cup, Aguascalientes, Points race (MEX)
1st Cape Town, Madison (RSA) (with Walter Pérez)
1st Fiorenzuola d' Arda, Six Days (ITA) (with Giovanni Lombardi)
1st Tre Giorni Citta di Pordenone (ITA) (with Walter Pérez)
1st Madison, National Track Championship, Cordoba (ARG) (with Walter Pérez)

2004
1st  Madison, UCI Track Cycling World Championships (with Walter Pérez)
3rd Points race, UCI Track Cycling World Championships, Melbourne
3rd Stage 5 Vuelta de San Juan (ARG)
1st UCI Track World Cup, Moscow, Madison (RUS) (with Walter Pérez)
3rd UCI Track World Cup, Moscow, Points race (RUS)
1st Aguascalientes, Points race (MEX)
1st Sydney, Madison (AUS) (with Walter Pérez)

2005
1st Points race, Pan American Championships, Mar del Plata
1st Madison, Pan American Championships, Mar del Plata (with Walter Pérez)
1st Tre Giorni Citta di Pordenone (ITA) (with Walter Pérez)
3rd Fiorenzuola d' Arda, Six Days (ITA)
2nd Torino, Six Days, Torino (ITA)

2006
2nd Clásica del Oeste-Doble Bragado (ARG)
2nd Stage 6a, Clásica del Oeste-Doble Bragado
2nd Madison, UCI Track Cycling World Championships, Bordeaux

2007
2nd Clásica del Oeste-Doble Bragado (ARG)
2nd Stage 6b, Clásica del Oeste-Doble Bragado
2nd Stage 6a, Clásica del Oeste-Doble Bragado
3rd UCI Track World Cup, Manchester, Points race (GBR)
2nd Clasica 1° de Mayo Argentina (ARG)
2nd Fiorenzuola d' Arda, Six Days (ITA)
1st Torino, Six Days (ITA) (with Walter Pérez)
2nd Apertura Mercedes (ARG)

2008
1st Stage 1, Criterium Internacional, Mar del Plata (ARG)
2nd Stage 2, Criterium Internacional, Mar del Plata (ARG)

2009
 National Time Trial Champion

References

External links

1965 births
Living people
Argentine male cyclists
Argentine people of French descent
Sportspeople from Mar del Plata
Cyclists at the 1983 Pan American Games
Cyclists at the 1984 Summer Olympics
Cyclists at the 1988 Summer Olympics
Cyclists at the 1996 Summer Olympics
Cyclists at the 1999 Pan American Games
Cyclists at the 2000 Summer Olympics
Cyclists at the 2003 Pan American Games
Cyclists at the 2004 Summer Olympics
Cyclists at the 2008 Summer Olympics
Olympic cyclists of Argentina
Olympic gold medalists for Argentina
Pan American Games gold medalists for Argentina
Olympic medalists in cycling
Medalists at the 2008 Summer Olympics
UCI Track Cycling World Champions (men)
Pan American Games silver medalists for Argentina
Pan American Games medalists in cycling
Argentine track cyclists
Medalists at the 1983 Pan American Games
Medalists at the 2003 Pan American Games
20th-century Argentine people
21st-century Argentine people